Shri Baij Nath Singh, AC was an Indian Civilian who was posthumously awarded India's highest peace time gallantry award Ashoka Chakra.

Early life 
Shri Rup Singh's son, Shri Baij Nath Singh was born in Chahipura village of Bhind district of Madhya Pradesh.In his family, there was a tradition of serving the Army bravely and devotion towards duty.

Gallant act 
This area of Bhind district was terrorized by dacoits and Baij Nath used to regret that a few dacoits would come and loot the entire village. To free his bandit prone area from their reign of terror, Baij Nath Singh set such an example of bravery that dacoits were terrified to enter his village again. Dacoits used to come, loot and kill the people recklessly, but once, Baij Nath decided that when the dacoits would come next time, they will not go back alive. And he did it, by putting his life at stake. On 22 October 1969, notorious dacoit Saru Singh killed Sri Mohar Singh and Sri Uday Singh of Malpura village. On hearing this news, citizens of Malpura and Rahauli village reached the crime spot and started indiscriminate firing on dacoits. Dacoits sensed the danger and ran away. But while leaving, they killed another villager. Chahipura citizen, Baij Nath Singh, also heard the sound of firing. He also started from home to fight the dacoits with his gun. The villagers tried to stop him saying that dacoits are more in number and they also have weapons, but Baij Nath did not listen to anyone and ran towards the dacoits. After following dacoits for 1 km, he saw the enemy group. Baijnath challenged the dacoits and started firing on them. They also responded with cross fire and kept firing for around half an hour. Baijnath was still fighting alone. After some time, the dacoits started surrounding him. Sensing danger, he tried to change his location, but until then, the dacoits already targeted him. He got shot by many bullets and died on the spot.

Ashoka Chakra awardee 
Fighting alone with dacoits, he showed immense courage. For his amazing bravery, he was posthumously awarded Ashoka Chakra.

References 

1969 deaths
Recipients of the Ashoka Chakra (military decoration)